Ág is a village in northern Baranya County, Hegyhát District, in southern Hungary. Its population at the 2011 Census was 177.
Until the end of World War II, the majority of the Inhabitants was Protestant Danube Swabians,  Mostly of the former German Settlers was expelled to Allied-occupied Germany and Allied-occupied Austria in 1945–1948, about the Potsdam Agreement.
Only a few Germans of Hungary live there, the majority today are the descendants of Hungarians from the Czechoslovak–Hungarian population exchange. They got the houses of the former Danube Swabians Inhabitants.

Local government 
The village is governed by a mayor with a four-person council. The local government of the village operates a joint council office with the nearby localities of Gerényes, Kisvaszar, Tarrós, Tékes and Vásárosdombó. Ág maintains a branch office, but the seat of the joint council is in Vásárosdombó.

As of the election of 2019, the village also has a local minority self-government for its Roma community, with three elected representatives.

Transportation 
The village is a cul-de-sac community, with only one access road connecting it to Road 6546 via nearby village Gerényes.

Railway 

 Vásárosdombó train station,  to the west of the village off Road 6546. The station is on the Pusztaszabolcs–Pécs railway line and is operated by MÁV.

Road 

 Road 6546 connects the village to Vásárosdombó to the west and Komló to the south.
 Main road 611, a north–south road accessible in Vásárosdombó, connects the village to its district seat Sásd and the town of Dombóvár.

External links 
 Street map 
 OpenStreetMap

References 

Populated places in Baranya County